Silverfish Trivia is an album by indie rock singer-songwriter Robert Pollard. It was released April 17, 2007 and is a 22-minute, seven-song mini-LP.

Track listing

 "Come Outside" (1:18)
 "Circle Saw Boys Club" (2:54)
 "Wickerman Smile" (2:01)
 "Touched to Be Sure" (4:20)
 "Waves, Etc." (1:31)
 "Cats Love a Parade" (7:56)
 "Speak in Many Colors" (2:09)

2007 albums
Robert Pollard albums